Rapid City Area Schools, formally Rapid City Area School District 51-4, is a public school district serving Rapid City, South Dakota with 31 schools.

History

Schools

Elementary schools

Black Hawk Elementary School
Canyon Lake Elementary School
Corral Drive Elementary School
General Beadle Elementary School
Grandview Elementary School
Horace Mann Elementary School
Knollwood Elementary School
Lakota Language Immersion

Meadowbrook Elementary School
Pinedale Elementary School
Rapid City Online Elementary
Rapid Valley Elementary School
Robbinsdale Elementary School
South Canyon Elementary School
South Park Elementary School
Valley View Elementary School
Wilson Elementary School

Middle schools
East Middle School
North Middle School
Rapid City Online Middle School
South Middle School
Southwest Middle School
West Middle School

High schools
Central High School
Stevens High School
Rapid City High School
Rapid City Online High School

Other schools
Alternative Education Center
Jefferson Academy
Virtual High School
Lincoln 9th grade

References

External links
Rapid City Area Schools

Education in Rapid City, South Dakota
School districts in South Dakota